Stony Hill is an album by Jamaican reggae artist Damian "Jr. Gong" Marley. The album was released on July 21, 2017 and went on to win the Grammy Award for Best Reggae Album.

Track listing  
"Intro" - 1:38
"Here We Go" - 4:43
"Nail Pon Cross" 3:24
"R.O.A.R." - 3:23
"Medication" (featuring Stephen Marley) - 3:42
"Time Travel" - 2:52
"Living It Up" - 3:59
"Looks Are Deceiving" - 4:37
"The Struggle Discontinues" - 4:39
"Autumn Leaves" - 5:03
"Everybody Wants To Be Somebody" - 3:39
"Upholstery" (featuring Major Myjah) - 3:50
"Grown & Sexy" (featuring Stephen Marley) - 4:05
"Perfect Picture" (featuring Stephen Marley) - 5:21
"So A Child May Follow" - 4:22
"Slave Mill" - 4:48
"Caution" - 3:58
"Speak Life" - 5:06

Commercial performance
Stony Hill debuted at number 65 on the Billboard 200 chart, with first-week sales of 6,000 copies in the United States. In 2017, Stony Hill was ranked as the most popular reggae album of the year in the United States. As of February 2018, the album has sold over 17,000 copies in the United States.

Charts

Weekly charts

Year-end charts

External links

References

2017 albums
Damian Marley albums
Grammy Award for Best Reggae Album
Reggae albums by Jamaican artists